Joel Lopez may refer to:

 Joël Lopez (footballer, born 1960), French midfielder for FC Girondins de Bordeaux
 Joel López (footballer, born 1982), Paraguayan forward for Deportes Melipilla
 Joel López Pissano, Argentine midfielder for C.S. Emelec
 Jhoel Lopez, see Shooting of David Ortiz